Fischen im Allgäu is a municipality in the district of Oberallgäu in Bavaria in Germany.

History 

During World War II, a subcamp of the Dachau concentration camp was located here.

References 

Oberallgäu